Days of Inspector Ambrosio (Italian: I giorni del commissario Ambrosio) is a 1988 Italian crime film directed by Sergio Corbucci. It is loosely based on several novels written by Renato Olivieri.

Plot
A few days before Inspector Ambrosio's holiday, a usual bank robbery takes place opposite his house. Then a playboy dies in a car “accident” that points to murder. The Inspector finds that his chief witness, a timid violinist and his drug-addicted daughter were closely involved with the victim. Can he “clear his desk” in time for his well-earned break?

Cast 

 Ugo Tognazzi: Commissario Ambrosio 
 Carlo Delle Piane: Renzo Bandelli 
 Claudio Amendola: Luciano 
 Cristina Marsillach: Sandra 
 Amanda Sandrelli: Antonia Quadri 
 Duilio Del Prete: Francesco Borghi 
 Rossella Falk: Rossella 
 Carla Gravina: Giulia Bandelli 
 Athina Cenci: Emanuela Quadri 
 Pupella Maggio: Rosa Cuomo 
 Teo Teocoli: Barbieri 
 Elvire Audray: "Friend" of Barbieri 
 Elio Crovetto: Carlo De Silva 
 Sal Borgese: Reggiani

References

External links

1988 crime films
Films directed by Sergio Corbucci
Films scored by Armando Trovajoli
Films set in Milan
Italian crime films
Police detective films
Films based on Italian novels
1980s Italian-language films
1980s Italian films